Raiders of the Lost Ark Adventure Pack is an adventure published by TSR in 1984 for the action-adventure role-playing game The Adventures of Indiana Jones Role-Playing Game, itself based on the Indiana Jones movie franchise.

Description
This role-playing adventure recreates the events of the movie Raiders of the Lost Ark. Players are expected to use pre-generated characters that are based on the characters from the movie.

Publication history
In 1984, TSR gained the license to make a role-playing game based on Indiana Jones, and released The Adventures of Indiana Jones Role-Playing Game the same year. Over the next two years, TSR supported the game with six adventures, the first being IJ1 Indiana Jones and the Temple of Doom Adventure Pack, followed by IJ2 Raiders of the Lost Ark Adventure Pack the same year. Raiders is a 32-page softcover book with a large map and outer folder written by Douglas Niles. Art was by Jeff Easley, and cartography was by David S. "Diesel" LaForce.  

The Indiana Jones role-playing game did not sell well, and TSR eventually ceased publication and allowed the license to expire. In 1994, West End Games acquired the rights to publish their own version of a role-playing game, The World of Indiana Jones.

Reception
In Issue 22 of Imagine, Paul Mason reviewed the first two adventures in the series, Indiana Jones and the Temple of Doom Adventure Pack and Raiders of the Lost Ark Adventure Pack, and felt the adventures should have branched out away from the movie storylines, saying, "My major gripe is that they both stick too closely to the films apart from the odd occasion here and there, the modules attempt to steer the characters into replaying the exact events of the films. Given that anyone playing In these scenarios has almost certainly seen the films, I'd anticipate the game being somewhat spoiled by such rigid adherence to the films' plots."

Other reviews
Different Worlds #39 (May/June, 1985)

References

Role-playing game adventures
Role-playing game supplements introduced in 1984
The Adventures of Indiana Jones Role-Playing Game